Kenneth Strong (born May 9, 1963) is a Canadian-born Austrian former professional ice hockey player. He played 15 games in the National Hockey League with the Toronto Maple Leafs from 1983 to 1985. The rest of his career, which lasted from 1983 to 1997, was mainly spent in the Austrian Hockey League. Nationalized as an Austrian citizen, Strong played internationally for the Austrian national team at the 1994 Winter Olympics and three World Championships.

Early life 
Strong was born in Toronto. As a youth, he played in the 1976 Quebec International Pee-Wee Hockey Tournament with a minor ice hockey team from Mississauga.

Career 
Strong played for the Austrian national ice hockey team in the 1994 Winter Olympics. He also briefly played 15 games in the NHL with the Toronto Maple Leafs in the 1980s.

Career statistics

Regular season and playoffs

International

References

External links
 

1963 births
Living people
Adirondack Red Wings players
Austrian ice hockey left wingers
Canadian expatriate ice hockey players in Austria
Canadian expatriate ice hockey players in Italy
Canadian ice hockey left wingers
EC Kapfenberg players
EC VSV players
HC Gardena players
Ice hockey people from Toronto
Ice hockey players at the 1994 Winter Olympics
Olympic ice hockey players of Austria
Peterborough Petes (ice hockey) players
Philadelphia Flyers draft picks
St. Catharines Saints players
Toronto Maple Leafs players